Waking Hour rose from the ashes of the Spokane WA prog metal band Eightfold Path. Guitarist Mike Calvert and singer Aaron Potter relocated to Seattle and joined original 8FP drummer Tony Duncan to reform the band under the new moniker.

Waking Hour has been featured on the online radio shows Audio Aggression and Stack and Di in Overdrive. Waking Hour's songs have also been played on: WKTF The Edge Worldwide, Dementiaradio.com, and MetalStorm radio.

Waking Hour has been reviewed by: The Music Blog, Metal Hammer Magazine (Greece) February 2007 in the "Thinking Man's Metal Page" section, and Seattle Metal Online.

Since their inception, Waking Hour has carved out their unique niche in the vast Progressive Metal landscape. By concentrating on writing smart, well arranged, yet technical songs, the band has strayed away from the overindulgence normally associated with the genre. At times Waking Hour has been loosely compared to Savatage, Fates Warning, and Queensryche.

The spring of 2007 saw the release of Waking Hours much anticipated debut cd "Hollow Man". The disc was met with critical acclaim by many publications around the world including Metal Hammer and The Metal Observer. Later that year the song Hollow Man appeared on the ProgPower USA VIII sampler.

Waking Hour has had the privilege of playing with some of their favorite bands including Kamelot, Sonata Arctica, Edguy, Epica, Into Eternity, Stratovarius, Cellador, and Visions of Atlantis. This, along with extensive internet radio airplay has helped the band garner a steadily growing cult following.

Lineup
Mike Calvert, lead guitar: 1993–present
Aaron Potter, lead vocals and rhythm guitar: 1997–present
Tony Duncan, drums: 1993–1996, 2004–present
Keith Brown, Keyboards 2010–present
Juan "Fish" Pena Bass 2002–2004, 2010–present

Discography
Featured on PowerProg VIII Compilation CD (Oct. 2007)
Hollow Man (full-length) (April 2007)
Demo (2006)
The Seeker (Demo) (2003)
Demo (1994)

External links
 Official Waking Hour web site

Musical groups from Washington (state)
Musical groups established in 1993